The Crystal Mountain is a ridge located within the White Desert, 120 km from Farafra, between Bahariya Oasis and Farafra Oasis.

The geological formation of the Crystal Mountain 
Crystal Mountain is one of the most expensive mountains in the world. It looks like a small arch made of rocks, and when the sun shines on it, it sparkles and shines like a king's crown made of thousands of precious and colourful jewels in the middle of a desert. This masterpiece has become a treasure that everyone looking for money and wealth wants to find. This is why it draws so many international and local tourists, who usually want to see life through a rocky gem scattered in the most beautiful view.

The Myth Of The Crystal mountain 
There are signs from the past that the area was made when a large meteorite hit the Earth and caused very high temperatures, which melted the rocks into pieces of valuable crystal.

References

Mountains of Egypt